Parklive is the third live album by British rock band Blur, released on 13 August 2012. The live album recorded the band's performance at Hyde Park, London on 12 August 2012, as part of the companion concert to the 2012 Summer Olympics closing ceremony. The title is a play on their 1994 album Parklife.

The digital download was released onto the iTunes Store within a day of the band's performance. The CD version was released the following week, with a bonus disc of live unreleased rarities. A deluxe edition was released in December 2012, which, in addition to the three CDs in the CD edition, contains the Hyde Park performance on DVD and a CD of the band's performance at the 100 Club.

Track listing

Personnel
Blur
Damon Albarn - vocals, acoustic guitar, keyboards
Graham Coxon - vocals, electric & acoustic guitars, lap steel guitar
Alex James - bass guitar
Dave Rowntree - drums
with
Mike Smith - keyboards, saxophone, clarinet
Alistair White, Barnaby Dickinson, Dan Carpenter - brass
Wayne Hernandez, Wendi Rose, Janet Ramus, Tyrone Henry - backing vocals
Phil Daniels - vocals on "Parklife"
Harry Enfield - 'The Tea Lady' on "Parklife"
Khyam Allami - oud on "Out of Time"

References

External links

Parklive at YouTube (streamed copy where licensed)
 

2012 live albums
2012 video albums
Blur (band) albums
Live video albums